Charles Shaul Hallac (October 20, 1964 – September 9, 2015) was an American businessman. He served as co-president of American financial company BlackRock.

Early life and education
Charles Hallac was born in Tel Aviv. He earned a BA degree in economics and computer science from Brandeis University in 1986.

Career
He joined BlackRock at its inception in 1988. Hallac had various roles at BlackRock, including the creation of the Aladdin system and was a co-founder of BlackRock Solutions which he ran until 2009.

Hallac was chief operating officer for BlackRock from 2009 until 2014. Prior to joining BlackRock in 1988, he was an associate in the Mortgage Products Group at The First Boston Corporation. In 2001,  Hallac, with his colleague, Bennett Golub, received the "Asset Management Risk Manager of the Year" award from Risk Magazine.

Personal life
Charles Hallac lived with his wife and their three children in Scarsdale, New York. He died on September 9, 2015, aged 50, following a four-year battle with colorectal cancer.

References

External links

1964 births
2015 deaths
Deaths from colorectal cancer
Brandeis University alumni
People from Scarsdale, New York
People from Manila
20th-century American businesspeople
20th-century American Jews
21st-century American businesspeople
21st-century American Jews